The Lost Special is a 1932 American Pre-Code Universal movie serial based on the 1898 short story "The Lost Special" by Arthur Conan Doyle.  This adaptation deleted all references to Doyle's Sherlock Holmes character, and moved events to the American Old West.

This was the 84th serial (and the 16th serial with sound) to be released by Universal.

Plot overview
A special train carrying gold bullion is hijacked on its way from the Golconda Mine. Laying down portable tracks, the bandits take the train off the main line, hide it in an abandoned mine shaft, steal the gold, and eradicate their makeshift tracks, leaving a mystery in their wake. Part owner of the mine, Potter Hood, and the railroad president, Horace Moore, search for the mysteriously disappeared train and gold. They are unaware, however, that the criminals are working secretly for Sam Slater, the other partner in the gold mine, who wants to sabotage mine operations enough that he can take over completely. Potter's son, Tom Hood, arrives home from college and determines to solve the mystery with the aid of his pal Bob Collins. They board the gold-shipment special train on its next run. Meanwhile, newspaper reporter Betty Moore – who is niece to the railroad president – and her friend Kate Bland begin their own investigation. After the four youths foil an attempt at a second heist, they join forces. The next 11 chapters show the characters' attempts to locate the "Lost Special" train and identify the ringleader.

Cliff-hanger endings include a runaway car sailing off a cliff into a lake, the heroine's car crashing headlong into an oncoming train and our heroes being trapped by rising water in a dungeon.

Cast
Frank Albertson as Tom Hood, son of Potter Hood
Ernie Nevers as Bob Collins, Tom's friend.
Cecilia Parker as Betty Moore, Reporter and niece of Horace Moore
Francis Ford as Potter Hood, part owner of the Golconda gold mine
J. Frank Glendon as Sam Slater, part owner of the Golconda gold mine
Frank Beal as Horace Moore, owner of the railroad
Caryl Lincoln as Kate Bland, friend of Betty Moore
Tom London as Dirk/Detective Dane
Al Ferguson as Gavin
Jack Clifford as Doran
Edmund Cobb as Spike
Joe Bonomo as Joe
George Magrill as Lefty
Reb Russell as one of Bob's college pals
Larry Steers as Maitre'd (uncredited)
Harry Tenbrook as Henchman (uncredited)

Stunts
George DeNormand
George Magrill

Production
The advertising for the serial stated: 

The Lost Special was Universal's 84th serial. In terms of Universal's serials in the sound era, it was the 16th. The series was written by veteran Universal serial writers Ella O'Neill, Basil Dickey, George Morgan, and George H. Plympton. The director was Henry MacRae. By the time he directed The Lost Special, MacRae had directed more than 100 short films and feature films.

Chapter titles
 The Lost Special
 Racing Death
 The Red Lantern
 Devouring Flames
 The Lighting Strikes
 The House of Mystery
 The Tank Room Terror
 The Fatal Race
 Into the Depths
 The Jaws of Death
 The Flaming Forest
 Retribution
Source:

See also
List of film serials by year
List of film serials by studio

References

External links

1932 films
1932 adventure films
American mystery films
American black-and-white films
1930s English-language films
Films based on short fiction
Films based on works by Arthur Conan Doyle
Universal Pictures film serials
Films directed by Henry MacRae
Films about train robbery
1930s mystery films
American adventure films
Films with screenplays by George H. Plympton
1930s American films